Yongping is a town in Jinggu Dai and Yi Autonomous County, Yunnan, China.

Administrative division
As of 2016, the town is divided into one community and thirty villages: 
 Tianyuan Community
 Mengga
 Tuanjie
 Qianying
 Geilong
 Mangfei
 Mangla
 Mangdong
 Qianmao
 Qiannuo
 Nangu
 Maomi
 Xi'e
 Shuanglong
 Xintang
 Xincun
 Zhongshan
 Xinghua
 Luolian
 Menglong
 Jingmenkou
 Chahe
 Minghe
 Pingjiang
 Fulong
 Mangpa
 Liu'an
 Waili
 Jinmu
 Yongxing
 Yonghe

Geography
It lies at the southwestern of Jinggu Dai and Yi Autonomous County, bordering Shuangjiang Lahu, Va, Blang and Dai Autonomous County to the west, Mengban Township, Bi'an Township and Banpo Township to the south, Linxiang District to the north, and Minle Town, Yizhi Township and Weiyuan Town to the east.

The Mengga River, a tributary of Lancang River, flows through the town south to north.

The Ximuhe Reservoir is a vast reservoir in the town, which provides drinking water and water for irrigation. It has also become a place for recreation for nearby residents.

Economy
The region's economy is based on agriculture, forestry, animal husbandry, and tourism.

Demographics

As of 2020, the National Bureau of Statistics of China estimates the town's population now to be 73,280.

Tourist attractions
The town boasts many Buddhist temples, including Qiannuo Temple, Leiguang Foji Temple, Hongwu Temple, and Mangdao Temple.

The Panying Wenbi Pagoda is a popular attraction.

Transportation
The County Road J35 passes across the town.

The China National Highway 323 passes across northern Yongping.

References

Bibliography

Towns of Pu'er City
Divisions of Jinggu Dai and Yi Autonomous County